The Jaraucu River is a river of Pará state in north-central Brazil, a tributary of the Xingu River.

The river flows through the Tapajós-Xingu moist forests ecoregion.
The river runs through the  Verde para Sempre Extractive Reserve, a sustainable use conservation unit created in 2004, before discharging into the Xingu.

See also
List of rivers of Pará

References

Brazilian Ministry of Transport

Rivers of Pará